The Roman Catholic Diocese of Araguaína is a diocese of the Roman Catholic Church in Brazil.

History
31 January 2023: the diocese was established from the diocesan territories of Tocantinópolis and Miracema do Tocantins.

See also
Roman Catholicism in Brazil

References

Roman Catholic dioceses in Brazil
Christian organizations established in 2023
Roman Catholic dioceses and prelatures established in the 21st century
Roman Catholic Ecclesiastical Province of Palmas